Colonel (R) Syed Ali Akhtar (‎ 1 January 1915 – 26  February 1982) was a Pakistani military officer. He was the first Muslim and Pakistani Commandant of R.P.A.S.C. Centre and Records and School, Chaklala, from 28 June to 5 September 1950, succeeding Colonel J.A.E. Armstrong.

Early life 
Syed Ali Akhtar was born in a Nawab family of Palwal, India. He was born im Palwal, District Gurgaon, Haryana, India on Friday, 1 January 1915 (15 Safar 1333 A.H.), to Nawabs Syed Ali Akbar and Khurshaidi Begum.

He excelled as a student and in sports and extra-curricular activities. In St. Stephen’s College, Delhi, he obtained high marks and secured 1st place among Muslim classmates.

Career
Syed Ali Akhtar joined the Indian Army on 15 May 1933. Throughout his Army career, he remained an exceptional and a highly dedicated soldier and commanded different units. He joined the Second Welsh Regiment at Agra on 1 February 1939. On completion of his attachment to the 2nd Welch Regiment in February 1940, he permanently joined the 5th Royal Mahrattas, an infantry battalion unit in the Indian Army.

On 3 September 1939, Great Britain declared war against Germany, which later on turned into the Second World War of 1939-1945. He was posted to Iraq during this period where he served in various capacities and commanded different units.

On 1 October 1947, he was part of the inaugural flight of Orient Airways (which flew from Calcutta to Karachi). Khawaja Nazimuddin, the then Premier of East Bengal, inaugurated the airline.

In May, 1950, Colonel J.A.E. Armstrong, Commandant of R.P.A.S.C. Centre and Records School Chaklala, was proceeding towards retirement and Akhtar was the next in line. He took over as the Second-in-Command of R.P.A.S.C. Centre and Records and School, Chaklala, on 31 May 1950. He took over as the first Muslim and Pakistani Commandant on 28 June 1950 and as Inspector R.P.A.S.C. at S & T directorate on 5 September 1950. He toured the country, including East Pakistan. The R.P.A.S.C. consisted of about thirty-five thousand officers and men, deployed across the country. He was given the additional task of revising training manuals. After a nervous breakdown, he retired early from the Army, on 11 August 1953.

In August 1953, Syed Ali Akhtar became the Administrator of The Punjab Government Cotton Mills, Lahore. In May 1955, he became General Manager of T.D.A. Mills, Bhakkar. He laid down foundations of Station Officers Club and a mosque in the Mills Colony.  On account of another health breakdown, he had to leave the job prematuraley in bhakkar also.

Personal life
Syed Ali Akhtar married Sayyeda Asima Khatoon, daughter of Syed Khalil-ur-Rehman, on 6 November 1941 in Lahore.  He had 5 children, 2 daughters and 3 sons. He was very religious, pious and humble. He was a highly intelligent and well read person who could speak urdu, english, person and arabic fluently.
He had a great number of friends both from army and civilian sector. He was highly respected by everyone.
He was a good tennis player and also a good small game hunter. 

His father-in-law, Syed Khalil-ur-Rehman, was a companion of Mr Muhammad Ali Jinnah. He was a member of the Pakistan Constituent Assembly and the Pakistan Muslim League, and was also Minister of State for Defence in Khwaja Nazim-ud-din's cabinet.

He spent his last days in Bahawalpur. In 1982, he suffered a heart attack and was admitted to Combined Military Hospital. He died on Friday, 26 February 1982.

External links 

  
 Lieut.-Col. J. A. E. ARMSTRONG (IA 678), 24 May 1948

1915 births
1982 deaths